The Munoa worm lizard  (Amphisbaena munoai) is a small species of amphisbaenian in the family Amphisbaenidae of the reptilian order Squamata. The species is endemic to southern South America.

Etymology
The specific name, munoai, is in honor of Uruguayan zoologist Juan Ignacio Muñoa (1925–1960).

Habitat and behavior
A. munoai can be found hiding under stones or decomposing bark. Hiding under stones allows the amphisbaenian to raise its body temperature without exposing itself to predators.

Diet
The main component of the diet of A. munoai consists of termites, but it also consumes various types of small insect larva.

Reproduction
A. munoai has a seasonal reproductive cycle. Females are able to be fertilized between June and October while males display a high testicle volume during this period. Females carry eggs from November to December and thus it is believed that copulation occurs from September to November. The eggs of A. munoai are frequently found in ant nests. Sexually mature males have a significantly smaller snout-vent length than sexually mature females.

Geographic range
A. munoai can be found in the pampas biome of southern Brazil, a temperate climate, and in Uruguay.

References

Further reading
Klappenbach, Miguel A. (1960). "Notas herpetológicas, I. Amphisbaena munoai n. sp. (Amphisbaenidae)". Comunicaciones Zoológicas del Museo de Historia Natural de Montevideo 4 (84): 3. (in Spanish).

Amphisbaena (lizard)
Reptiles described in 1960
Taxa named by Miguel Angel Klappenbach
Reptiles of Brazil
Reptiles of Uruguay